Jacob Ellison (born 25 February 1985 in Wellington, New Zealand) is a New Zealand rugby union footballer who plays for Fukuoka Sanix Blues in the Japanese Top League. He plays the position of prop.

Ellison made his Wellington debut in 2007 and his Hurricanes debut a year later. After four years with the Hurricanes, he played for the Highlanders in 2012. He was delisted at the end of the season after making only one competition appearance.

Ellison is a graduate of Victoria University of Wellington. He is a member of Ngati Porou. He is the younger brother of All Black Tamati Ellison and the grandson of the All Black Vincent Bevan.

External links
Otago Profile
Wellington Lions Player Profile
Hurricanes Player Profile
NZ Maori player profile

Living people
1985 births
Ngāi Tahu people
New Zealand rugby union players
Māori All Blacks players
Victoria University of Wellington alumni
Hurricanes (rugby union) players
Highlanders (rugby union) players
Wellington rugby union players
Rugby union players from Wellington City
Rugby union props
Munakata Sanix Blues players
New Zealand expatriate rugby union players
New Zealand expatriate sportspeople in Japan
Expatriate rugby union players in Japan
People educated at Mana College
Ellison family